Zlynkovsky (masculine), Zlynkovskaya (feminine), or Zlynkovskoye (neuter) may refer to:
Zlynkovsky District, a district of Bryansk Oblast, Russia
Zlynkovsky Urban Administrative Okrug, an administrative division which the town of Zlynka and two rural localities in Zlynkovsky District of Bryansk Oblast, Russia are incorporated as
Zlynkovskoye Urban Settlement, a municipal formation which Zlynkovsky Urban Administrative Okrug in Zlynkovsky District of Bryansk Oblast, Russia is incorporated as